Theodore Landon "Ted" Streleski (b. 1936) is an American former graduate student in mathematics at Stanford University who murdered his former faculty advisor, Professor Karel de Leeuw, with a ball-peen hammer on August 18, 1978. Shortly after the murder, Streleski turned himself in to the authorities, claiming he felt the murder was justifiable homicide because de Leeuw had withheld departmental awards from him, demeaned Streleski in front of his peers, and refused his requests for financial support.  Streleski was in his 19th year pursuing his doctorate in the mathematics department, alternating with low-paying jobs to support himself.

During his trial Streleski told the court he felt the murder was "logically and morally correct" and "a political statement" about the department's treatment of its graduate students, and he forced his court-appointed lawyer to enter a plea of "not guilty" rather than "not guilty by reason of insanity" as the lawyer had urged.  Streleski was convicted of second degree murder with a sentence of eight years. 
He served seven years in prison at California Medical Facility.

Streleski was eligible for parole on three occasions, but turned it down as the conditions of his parole required him to get psychiatric treatment. Upon his release in 1985, he said, "I have no intention of killing again. On the other hand, I cannot predict the future."

In 1993 Streleski was turned down for a fare box repair position with the San Francisco Municipal Railway after his crime came to light.

References

External links
A commemorative article by Stanford's alumni association
 When Student-Adviser tensions erupt

1936 births
American people convicted of murder
People convicted of murder by California
Place of birth missing (living people)
Stanford University alumni
Living people
Criminals of the San Francisco Bay Area
Violence at universities and colleges